The units of measurement of German-speaking countries consist of a variety of units, with varying local standard definitions. While many were made redundant with the introduction of the metric system, some of these units are still used in everyday speech and even in stores and on street markets as shorthand for similar amounts in the metric system. For example, some customers ask for one pound (ein Pfund) of something when they want 500 grams.

The metric system became compulsory on 1 January 1872, in Germany and on 1 January 1876, in Austria.

Some obsolete German units have names similar to units that were traditionally used in other countries, and that are still used in a limited number of cases in the United Kingdom (imperial units) and fully in the United States (United States customary units).

German system

Before the introduction of the metric system in German, almost every town had its own definitions of the units shown below.  Often towns posted local definitions on a wall of the city hall.  For example, the front wall of the old city hall of Rudolstadt (still standing) has two marks which show the “Rudolstädter Elle”, the proper length of the Elle in that city.  Supposedly by 1810 there were 112 different standards for the Elle around Germany. 
“...the measure of cloth, for example, was elle which in each region stood for a different length. An elle of textile material brought in Frankfurt would get you 54.7 cm of cloth, in Mainz 55.1 cm, in Nuremberg 65.6 cm, in Freiburg 53.5 cm...”

Length

Meile (mile)

A common German mile, land mile, or post mile (Gemeine deutsche Meile, Landmeile,  Postmeile) was defined in various ways at different places and different times.

Wegstunde
One hour's travel, used up to the 19th century. After 1722 in Saxony  post mile = 1000 Dresden rods = 4531 m. In Switzerland .

Fuß (foot)
The Fuß or German foot varied widely from place to place in the German-speaking world, and also with time. In some places, more than one type of Fuß was in use. One source from 1830 gives the following values:

Rute (rod)

The Rute or Ruthe is of Carolingian origin, and was used as a land measure. Many different kinds of Ruthe were used at various times in various parts of the German-speaking world. They were subdivided into differing numbers of local Fuß, and were of many different lengths. One source from 1830 lists the following:

Klafter 

Originally 6 feet, after introduction of the metric system 10 feet.

Lachter

The Lachter was the most common unit of length used in mining in German-speaking areas.

Elle (ell)
Distance between elbow and fingertip. In the North, often 2 feet, In Prussia  feet, in the South variable, often  feet.

Zoll (inch)

Linie
Usually  inch, but also .

Volume

Quent
Being 1/5 of any measure

Malter
Is a larger volumen unit of around one large sack of wheat a person could carry. However, the exact volumetric size and weight was locally very different in each feudal state. For more details, see .

Klafter

For firewood,

Nösel
In general, the Nösel (also spelled Össel) was a measure of liquid volume equal to half a Kanne ("jar," "jug," "bottle," "can"). Volume often varied depending on whether it was beer or wine. Its subdivisions were the Halbnösel ("Half-Nösel") and the Viertelnösel ("Quarter-Nösel).

An Ahm was a measure used for wine or beer. An Eimer ("Bucket") was a container that was a fifth of an Ahm. A Viertel ("Fourth") was a fourth of an Eimer. A Stübchen ("Cozy Room") also a Stauf was a measure of wine or beer that was equal to 2 Kannen. It was the approximate amount of wine or beer that could serve an entire room in a tavern. A Kanne was a measure of wine or beer large enough to fill a humpen (tankard) or krug (wine flagon or beer pitcher). A Quartier ("quarter-measure") was a fourth of a Stübchen. A Nösel was a cup or mug of wine or beer.

Actual volumes so measured, however, varied from one state or even one city to another. The full volume of a "Leipzig jar" measured ; the Leipzig nösel was therefore .

 Ahm =  Eimer =  Viertel =  Stübchen / Stauf =  Kannen =  Quartiers = 1 Nösel = 2 Halbnöseln = 4 Viertelnöseln

The nösel was used in minor commerce, as well as in the household to measure meal, grain, and such. These units of measure were officially valid in Saxony until 1868, when the metric system was introduced.  Nevertheless, the old measures have continued in private use for decades.

One modification was introduced in Thuringia.  There, the nösel was, by extension, also a measure of area; namely, the area of land which could be sown with one nösel of seed — or about

Weight

Pfund

Old German (Prussian) Pfund: Unit equivalent to more recent Zollpfund:

Mark
 
 Pfund. Equal to 233.9g (Roughly 8.250oz)

Unze
 of a Pfund. Equal to 29.23g (Roughly 1.031oz)

Loth
Equal to 14.62g (Roughly 0.512oz)

Quentchen
 of a Pfund. Roughly Equal to 4.872g

Quint
 of a Pfund. Roughly Equal to 3.654g

Pfennig
 of a Pfund. Roughly Equal to 0.9135g

Gran
 of a Pfund. Equal to 60.9 mg (0.9398306 grains)

See also
 Historical weights and measures
 List of obsolete units of measurement
 SI
 Weights and measures

References

Bibliography
François Cardarelli: Encyclopedia of Scientific Units, Weights and Measures. Their SI Equivalences and Origins. Springer, Berlin 2003. 
Helmut Kahnt, Bernd Knorr: Alte Masse, Münzen und Gewichte. . Bibliographisches Institut Mannheim/Wien/Zürich 1987. (Lizenzausgabe von VEB Bibliographisches Institut Leipzig 1986) 
Wolfgang Trapp: Kleines Handbuch der Maße, Zahlen Gewichte und der Zeitrechnung. Von . Reclam Stuttgart, 2. Auflage 1996.  
Günther Scholz, Klaus Vogelsang: Kleines Lexikon: Einheiten, Formelzeichen. Fachbuchverlag Leipzig 1991  
Johann Christian Nelkenbrechers Taschenbuch eines Banquiers und Kaufmanns: enthaltend eine Erklärung aller ein- und ausländischen Münzen, des Wechsel-Courses, Usos, Respect-Tage und anderer zur Handlung gehörigen Dinge; mit einer genauen Vergleichung des Ellen-Maaßes, Handels-, Gold- und Silber-Gewichts, auch Maaße von Getreide und flüssigen Sachen derer fürnehmsten europäischen Handels-Plätze. Nachdruck der Ausgabe 1769: VDM Verlag Dr. Müller, Düsseldorf 2004.

External links
 Projekt zur Erschliessung historisch wertvoller Altkartenbestände 

Systems of units
Science and technology in Germany
German obsolete units of measurement
German obsolete units of measurement
Units of measurement of the Holy Roman Empire